Erik Jørgensen (21 April 1920 – 9 June 2005) was a Danish middle-distance runner. He competed in the men's 1500 metres at the 1948 Summer Olympics.

References

1920 births
2005 deaths
Athletes (track and field) at the 1948 Summer Olympics
Danish male middle-distance runners
Olympic athletes of Denmark
Place of birth missing